Peperomia ventricosicarpa is a species of plant from the genus Peperomia It was discovered by William Trelease in 1936 and published the species in the book "Publication. Field Museum of Natural History Botanical series".

Etymology
Ventricosicarpa came from the word "ventricose". Ventricose defines as swollen or inflated on one side.

Distribution
Peperomia ventricosicarpa is endemic to Peru.

Peru
Loreto
Itaya River

References

ventricosicarpa
Flora of Peru
Plants described in 1936
Taxa named by William Trelease